Thunder Town is a 1946 American Western film directed by Harry L. Fraser and written by Oliver Drake. The film stars Bob Steele, Syd Saylor, Ellen Hall, Bud Geary, Charles King and Edward Howard. The film was released on April 12, 1946, by Producers Releasing Corporation.

Plot

Cast          
Bob Steele as Jim Brandon
Syd Saylor as Utah McGirk
Ellen Hall as Betty Morgan
Bud Geary as Chuck Wilson
Charles King as Bill Rankin
Edward Howard as Dunc Rankin
Steve Clark as Sheriff Matt Warner
Bud Osborne as Henry Carson
Jimmy Aubrey as Peter Collins

References

External links
 

1946 films
1940s English-language films
American Western (genre) films
1946 Western (genre) films
Producers Releasing Corporation films
Films directed by Harry L. Fraser
American black-and-white films
1940s American films